Prodyot Kumar Mahanti (born c.1940) is an Indian former politician. Mahanti was elected to the West Bengal Legislative Assembly from the Dantan constituency in the 1972 West Bengal Legislative Assembly election, then a 32-year old lawyer and Congress (O) candidate. Mahanti won the Dantan seat again as a Janata Party candidate in 1977 and 1982. In the 1987 West Bengal Legislative Assembly election he was elected from the Patashpur constituency as a Congress (I) candidate.

References

Year of birth uncertain
Living people
Indian National Congress politicians
Indian National Congress (Organisation) politicians
Janata Party politicians
West Bengal MLAs 1972–1977
West Bengal MLAs 1977–1982
West Bengal MLAs 1982–1987
West Bengal MLAs 1987–1991
Year of birth missing (living people)